Jonestown, Ohio may refer to:

 Jonestown, Jackson County, Ohio
 Jonestown, Van Wert County, Ohio